Marc Douglas Wilson (born February 15, 1957) is an American former football quarterback who played in the National Football League (NFL) for 10 seasons, primarily with the Raiders franchise. He played college football at BYU, where he set the NCAA record for passing yards and won the Sammy Baugh Trophy. Selected by the Raiders in the first round of the 1980 NFL Draft, Wilson spent seven seasons with the team during their Oakland and Los Angeles tenure. In his final two seasons, he was a member of the New England Patriots. Wilson was inducted to College Football Hall of Fame in 1996.

Early years
Wilson was born in Bremerton, Washington. Raised in the greater Seattle area, he attended Shorecrest High School in Shoreline, Washington.

College career
Wilson attended Brigham Young University, where he played for the BYU Cougars football team from 1976 to 1979 and was one of the first in BYU's celebrated line of quarterbacks. Cougars coach LaVell Edwards operated a passing-oriented offense that allowed his quarterbacks to throw the ball almost every single down. Thus, Wilson was able to pile up huge passing numbers in an era when most teams mainly focused on running the ball. Wilson received a bachelor's degree in Economics from Brigham Young University in 1980. In 1996, he received an executive MBA from the University of Washington.

He first got a chance to start in the fifth game of the 1977 season, replacing All-American Gifford Nielsen, who had gone down after four contests with an injury. During that 1977 season, his sophomore year, he threw for seven touchdown passes in one game against Colorado State University, his first start. After that, he started most of BYU's games over the next two-and-a-half seasons, racking up a 22–4 record, though he did yield a few starts to budding star Jim McMahon. In 1979, he threw 250 completions for 3,720 yards and 29 touchdown passes, becoming the school's first consensus All-American. Highlights of his 1979 season included leading the team to an undefeated regular season and a berth in the Holiday Bowl, where he shared the MVP trophy with Indiana University cornerback Tim Wilbur in BYU's 38-37 loss. He finished fourth in the nation in passing efficiency, third in the Heisman voting, and was named the Senior Bowl MVP. Wilson's success paved the way for McMahon, Steve Young, Robbie Bosco, Ty Detmer, and other BYU quarterbacks, all of whom had similar performances in Edwards' system.

College statistics

* Includes bowl games.

Football career 
Wilson was selected in the first round of the 1980 NFL Draft by the Oakland Raiders. As a rookie, he was a backup alongside Jim Plunkett on the Raiders to Dan Pastorini. A fractured leg injury for Pastorini opened the door for Plunkett because of his experience over the rookie, which resulted in a trip to Super Bowl XV and a victory over the Philadelphia Eagles. The following year, Wilson would start nine games for the Raiders following a season ending injury to Plunkett. He won five of those games while throwing for 2,311 yards on 14 touchdowns to 19 interceptions. In 1982, he was the backup to Plunkett during a strike shortened NFL season consisting of only nine games. In 1983, he became the starting quarterback for the Raiders in the middle of the season, but it lasted just three games before a broken shoulder against the Kansas City Chiefs knocked him out for the entire season. The Raiders, led by Plunkett, would go on to a Super Bowl XVIII victory against the Washington Redskins. The following year, he was the starter for ten games and won six of them while throwing for 2,151 yards with fifteen touchdowns to seventeen interceptions. A broken thumb during a matchup against the Chicago Bears cost him the rest of the year (his second year that ended with an injury). The following year was his first (and as it turned out only) chance to play as the regular starter. He started thirteen games and led the Raiders to eleven wins and an AFC West title while throwing for a career high 2,608 yards with sixteen touchdowns to 21 interceptions. He made the start in the AFC wild card game against the New England Patriots. He threw 11-of-27 for 135 yards with a touchdown and three interceptions. The next year, he started eight games and threw 1,721 yards with 12 touchdowns to 15 interceptions. He closed out his Raiders career in 1987 as the starter for seven games (two wins) while throwing for 2,070 yards with 12 touchdowns to eight interceptions. He moved on to the Patriots (after being cut by the Green Bay Packers in training camp) in 1989 and started 10 games in two seasons combined. He retired at the age of 33 in 1990.

See also
 List of NCAA major college football yearly passing leaders
 List of NCAA major college football yearly total offense leaders

References

External links
 
 

1957 births
Living people
American football quarterbacks
BYU Cougars football players
Los Angeles Raiders players
New England Patriots players
Oakland Raiders players
All-American college football players
Players of American football from Seattle
College Football Hall of Fame inductees
People from Bremerton, Washington
People from Shoreline, Washington
American Latter Day Saints
Brigham Young University alumni